Korla, also known as Kurla or from Mandarin Chinese as Ku'erle or Kuerle, is the second largest city in Xinjiang. It is a county-level city and the seat of the Bayingolin Mongol Autonomous Prefecture, the largest prefecture of China.

Korla has existed since at least the Han Dynasty. Korla is known for its production of fragrant pears and is a production center for the Tarim oil fields.

History

Han Dynasty
Korla was known as Yuli (reconstructed pronunciation of first character: *i̯wəd) during the Han Dynasty. Yuli is said in the Hanshu or 'History of the Former Han' (covering the period 125 BCE to 23 CE), to have had 1,200 households, 9,600 individuals and 2,000 people able to bear arms. It also mentions that it adjoined Shanshan and Qiemo (Charchan) to the south.

In 61 CE, the Xiongnu led some 30,000 troops from 15 kingdoms including Korla, Karashahr, and Kucha in a successful attack on Khotan.

In 94 CE, the Chinese general Ban Chao sent soldiers to punish the kingdoms of Yanqi (Karashahr), Weixu (Hoxud), Yuli (Korla), and Shanguo (in the western Kuruk mountains).

"He then sent the heads of the two kings of Yanqi (Karashahr) and Yuli (Korla) to the capital where they were hung in front of the residences of the Man and Yi princes in the capital (Luoyang). (Ban) Chao then appointed Yuan Meng, who was the Yanqi (Karashahr) Marquis of the Left, king (of Kashgar). The kings of Yuli (Korla), Weixu (Hoxud), and Shanguo (in the western Kuruk mountains) were all replaced."

After the rebellion of the "Western Regions" (106−125 CE), only the kings of Korla and Hoxud refused to submit to the Chinese. Ban Yong, the son of Ban Chao, along with the Governor of Dunhuang, attacked and defeated them.

Three Kingdoms era
The 3rd century Weilüe records that Korla, Hoxud and Shanwang (Shanguo) were all dependencies of Karashahr.

Yettishar
The contemporaneous historian Musa Sayrami (1836–1917)  stated that ruler Yaqub Beg of Yettishar was poisoned on May 30, 1877 in Korla by the former hakim (local city ruler) Niyaz Hakim Beg of Yarkand, although Niyaz Hakim Beg and other sources stated that his death was by suicide or in battle against the Qing dynasty.

Qing dynasty
Francis Younghusband, passed through "Korlia" in 1887 on his overland journey from Beijing to India. He described it as being prosperous and the country round about well-cultivated, with more land under cultivation than any other town he had passed. Maize seemed to be the major crop but rice was also grown. There were round bastions at the angles, but none at the gateway. A mile (1.6 km) south was the Turk town, but its walls were in ruins. "The shops are somewhat better than at Karashar, but not so good as at Turfan."

People's Republic of China 
Korla was incorporated as a city on September 30, 1979.

On January 8, 1965, more than 170 Chinese Communist cadres were immolated by Mongols during an anti-Communist riot at a state farm in Korla (Kurla).

In September 2019, drone video appeared which ASPI (a defense industries funded Australian think tank) alleged as showing the mass transfer of hundreds of ethnic minority prisoners, which drew the comment "deeply disturbing" from Australian Foreign Minister Marise Payne in describing the video.

Geography

The Kaidu River, also known as the Konqi River or Kongque River, flows through the center of Korla, a unique feature amongst cities in Xinjiang. While the literal meaning of the Chinese name "Kongque River" is "Peacock River", the name originates from a semantically distorted transliteration of the Uyghur name "Konqi Darya" which means "Tanner's River".

Climate
Korla has a cold desert climate (Köppen climate classification BWk) with extreme seasonal variation in temperature. The frost-free period averages 210 days. The period between April and October closely resembles subtropical climates, but the continental nature is facilitated by the rapid drop of temperatures going into winter.

Administrative divisions 
Korla administers 7 subdistricts, 3 towns, 9 townships, 9 township-level state farms, and 2 Xinjiang Production and Construction Corps regiments.

Subdistricts 

Towns 

Townships 

Township-level state farms 

Xinjiang Production and Construction Corps regiments 
The Xinjiang Production and Construction Corps has 2 regiments within Korla: its  and its .

Demographics 
In the 2010 Chinese Census, the city had a total population of 549,324 people, a significant increase from the 381,943 recorded in the 2000 Census. The city is home to 23 ethnic groups.

The city had 430,000 inhabitants in 2007, increasing with 20,000 people every year, majority of whom were Han Chinese, with a large minority of Uyghurs (about 100,000) and smaller numbers of Mongols and Huis.

Economy

Korla has long been the biggest centre in the region after Karashahr/Yanqi itself, having abundant water and extensive farmlands, as well as controlling the main routes to the south and west of Karashahr/Yanqi. Due to the discovery of oil in the Taklamakan Desert, Korla is now both more populous and  developed than Karashar/Yanqi. PetroChina's Tarim oil fields operations are headquartered in Korla.

The city reported a fiscal revenue of 4.572 billion Yuan in 2019. In the same year, the city's GDP grew 5.6%, fixed asset investment grew 10%, the public budget grew 5%, retail sales grew 8%, and the city's CPI grew 2.3%.

Korla is known for its production of fragrant pears.

Transportation 
Korla is served by the national highways G218, G314, the Southern Xinjiang Railway and the Korla Licheng Airport.

Cultural sights 

The city's main attractions include the Iron Gate Pass, Lotus Pond, Sun Island, Princess Peak, Yuzigan Old City, Tuowuqi Ancient City, Ailike Ancient City, Ku'erchu Mound, Jiamai Mosque, and Yeyungou Ruins.

See also
 Yuli County
 Korla Missile Test Complex

References

Citations

Sources 
 Hill, John E. (2009). Through the Jade Gate to Rome: A Study of the Silk Routes during the Later Han Dynasty, 1st to 2nd Centuries CE. BookSurge, Charleston, South Carolina. .
 Mallory, J. P. and Mair, Victor H. 2000. The Tarim Mummies: Ancient China and the Mystery of the Earliest Peoples from the West. Thames & Hudson, London.
 Stein, Aurel M. 1921. Serindia: Detailed report of explorations in Central Asia and westernmost China, 5 vols. London & Oxford. Clarendon Press. Reprint: Delhi. Motilal Banarsidass. 1980.
 Stein Aurel M. 1928. Innermost Asia: Detailed report of explorations in Central Asia, Kan-su and Eastern Iran, 5 vols. Clarendon Press. Reprint: New Delhi. Cosmo Publications. 1981.
 von Le Coq, Albert. 1928. Buried Treasures of Turkestan. Reprint with Introduction by Peter Hopkirk, Oxford University Press. 1985.

External links

 More information
 Korla Travel Guide
 The Opposite End of China (Korla, Xinjiang Blog)

 
Populated places in Xinjiang
Populated places along the Silk Road
Bayingolin Mongol Autonomous Prefecture
County-level divisions of Xinjiang